The Bubble Houses, also known as the Goodyear Balloon Houses, were four (three single and one double) bubble or airform houses designed by Wallace Neff and built at the Wigwam Resort in Litchfield Park, Arizona, during the 1940s. They were demolished during the 1980s.

History 
Located in a row "on the fairway of the first hole of the Wigwam's golf course" at the Wigwam Resort in Litchfield Park, Arizona, a community developed by Goodyear.  and built between 1942 and 1944 by Case Construction Company of San Pedro, California, the Bubble Houses were designed by architect Wallace Neff using his patented airform Monolithic dome system, consisting of reinforced concrete cast in place over an inflatable balloon made by the Goodyear Tire and Rubber Company. Once the outer shell of concrete and insulation had hardened, the balloon was removed. The Double Bubble House consisted of two single units joined by a conventional single-story structure. Each Bubble House contained two bedrooms and one bath, a kitchen, living room, pantry with refrigerator, and patio.

All four houses, intended as "alternative wartime housing", were similar to the twelve Neff-designed bubble houses, ten doubles and two singles, previously built by Case in Falls Church, Virginia. The houses were the subject of a 1944 Architectural Record article.

Described as "ideal accommodation for golfers", rates for staying in the Bubble Houses were set at US$42 per night, for two people, during the 1958–59 season. The houses were in use as rentals or employee-housing until the 1970s. In the 1980s Goodyear sold the Wigwam project and the new owners demolished all four bubble houses.

See also
Bubble Houses (Hobe Sound, Florida)

References
Notes

Bibliography

External links
 CaliSphere: Photos of the single bubble houses by Maynard Parker
 Phyllis Richardson, Achhetcetera, Bubble Up, photos
 Wigwam Resort website

Houses in Maricopa County, Arizona
Demolished buildings and structures in Arizona
Wallace Neff buildings
Bubble houses
1942 establishments in Arizona
1980s disestablishments in Arizona
Buildings and structures demolished in the 1980s